The 2009 Supertaça Cândido de Oliveira was the 31st edition of the Supertaça Cândido de Oliveira, the annual Portuguese football season-opening match contested by the winners of the previous season's top league and cup competitions (or cup runner-up in case the league- and cup-winning club is the same). The match was contested by the 2008–09 Primeira Liga winners, Porto and the 2008–09 Taça de Portugal runners-up, Paços de Ferreira, as Porto also won the Taça de Portugal in the same season.

The final took place at the Estádio Municipal de Aveiro in Aveiro on 9 August 2009. Porto participated in their 25th Supertaça final, their fourth consecutive final since 2006. Porto went into the match as the Supertaça Cândido de Oliveira 15-time winners. Paços de Ferreira qualified for the competition for the first time in their history. Porto defeated Paços de Ferreira 2–0 with goals from Ernesto Farías and Bruno Alves. With this win, Porto raised their Supertaça tally to 16.

Match

Details

References

Supertaça Cândido de Oliveira
FC Porto matches
F.C. Paços de Ferreira matches
2009–10 in Portuguese football